The Burnett County Government Center houses the majority of local county governmental services for Burnett County, Wisconsin. It is located in the town of Meenon.

The Burnett County Government Center is in the modern office building style and was designed in 1983 by Ozolins & D’Jock Architects, Ltd. of Eau Claire, Wisconsin. Major construction was by Construction Analysis & Management of Minneapolis and the project completed in fall 1984. The formal building dedication took place on Saturday, April 27, 1985. Construction costs were within the original budgeted 3.6 million dollars.

The facility houses the Courts System, Sheriff's Department, Jail, and all other County Agencies except for the Airport, Highway, and Forestry Departments.

A major exterior masonry renovation took place in 2003. The design was by Ayres Associates, an architectural/engineering company based in Eau Claire, Wisconsin, with construction by Huotari Construction of Medford, Wisconsin.

External links
Burnett County website

Buildings and structures in Burnett County, Wisconsin
County courthouses in Wisconsin